This is a list of musicology topics. Musicology is the scholarly study of music. A person who studies music is a musicologist. The word is used in narrow, intermediate and broad senses. In the narrow sense, musicology is confined to the music history of Western culture. In the intermediate sense, it includes all relevant cultures and a range of musical forms, styles, genres and traditions, but tends to be confined to the humanities - a combination of historical musicology, ethnomusicology, and the humanities of systematic musicology (philosophy, theoretical sociology, aesthetics). In the broad sense, it includes all musically relevant disciplines (both humanities and sciences) and all manifestations of music in all cultures, so it also includes all of systematic musicology (including psychology, biology, and computing).

Musicology topics

A
 American Musicological Society
 Art music

B
 Bibliography of Music Literature
 Bisector (music)
 Byzantine chant

C
 Campanology
 Catchiness
 Chinese musicology
 CHOMBEC
 Cognitive musicology
 Cognitive neuroscience of music
 Computational musicology
 Contemporary harpsichord

D
 Department of Musicology (Palacký University, Faculty of Philosophy)
 Claudio Di Veroli
 Diatonic set theory
 Dickinson classification
 Documentation Centre for Music

E
 Ecomusicology
 Embodied music cognition
 Ethnomusicology
 Evolutionary musicology
 Exploring Music

F

 Fanfare (magazine)
 Forschungsinstitut für Musiktheater

G
 Gebrauchsmusik
Galant Schemata

H
 Harshness
 History of classical music traditions
 Berthold Hoeckner

I
 Institute for History of Musical Reception and Interpretation
 International Research Center for Traditional Polyphony

J
 Jazz collections at the University Library of Southern Denmark

K
 Liudmila Kovnatskaya

L
 Ludomusicology

M
 Melody type
 Mensural notation
 Music and politics
 Music history
 Music psychology
 The Music Trades (magazine)
 Musica poetica
 Musical gesture

N
 New musicology

O
 Opus (classical record magazine)
 Organology

P
 Psychoanalysis and music

R
 Rastrum
 Répertoire International des Sources Musicales
 Royal Musical Association
 Russian Orthodox bell ringing

S
 Schizophonia
 Single affect principle
 Sociomusicology
 Sonus (journal)
 Sound culture
 Spectromorphology
 State Institute for Music Research
 Systematic musicology

T
 Tanabe Hisao Prize
 The Musical Leader
 Timbral listening
 Tonkunst
 Treatise on Instrumentation
 Tune-family

V
 Vijayanagara musicological nonet
 Virtual Library of Musicology

W
 White power music
 Women in Music

Z
 Znamenny chant

See also

References

Musicology